Giuseppe "Peppe" Poeta (born September 12, 1985) is an Italian former professional basketball player. He played the point guard position.

Professional career
Poeta joined local club Pallacanestro Salerno in the lower divisions, playing 5 seasons before joining Prima Veroli of the third division.
With Veroli he scored 51 points in a 7 November 2005 114-105 victory against Forlì.

He moved to first division Serie A club Teramo Basket in 2006.
During the 2008-09 season he led the team, coached by former Salerno coach Andrea Capobianco , to the league play-offs.

He then joined Virtus Bologna where he had two successful seasons, reaching the play-offs twice and being appointed captain.
However after a difficult 2012-13 season where the team finished two places above last place the management decided to change the side, appointing young Matteo Imbrò  as the starting point guard. Poeta found himself frozen out of the team, rescinding his contract in November 2013.

It was to prove a blessing in disguise as it allowed him to join Laboral Kutxa Vitoria, a team playing in the competitive Liga ACB and Europe's elite EuroLeague, as Thomas Heurtel's substitute.

His debut for the side on 12 January 2014 saw him score 13 points in the last quarter against Gipuzkoa to earn a victory.

He joined another Liga ACB side for the 2014-15 season, signing with La Bruixa d'Or Manresa.
However, an injury that kept him sidelined for most of the season would see him play only six games.

In July 2015, Poeta returned to Italy, signing a one-year deal with Dolomiti Energia Trento.

On 29 June 2016, Poeta signed with Auxilium Torino for the 2016–17 season.

On February 18, 2018, Poeta went to win the 2018 edition of the Italian Basketball Cup with Fiat Torino by beating Germani Basket Brescia 69–67 in the Finals.

On June 24, 2019, he has signed with Reggio Emilia of the Italian Lega Basket Serie A (LBA). 

However, at the end of the season Reggio Emilia and Poeta parted ways, and on August 5, 2020, he signed a 1+1 contract with Vanoli Cremona.

International career
After being called up for the first time in 2007, Poeta established himself in the Italian national team fold.

He was part of the Italy squad for EuroBasket 2013 though he had a limited impact, with 4 points in less than 6 minutes on average.

Poeta was called up to the preliminary Italy squad for EuroBasket 2015, but he did not make the final cut.

Personal
His first participation in basketball was as a scorekeeper for home town club Polisportiva Battipagliese where his father Franco was a press officer. He later played for the team at youth level.

References

External links
Serie A profile  Retrieved 22 July 2015
EuroCup profile Retrieved 22 July 2015
Liga ACB profile  Retrieved 22 July 2015

1985 births
Living people
Aquila Basket Trento players
Auxilium Pallacanestro Torino players
Bàsquet Manresa players
Italian expatriate basketball people in Spain
Italian men's basketball players
Lega Basket Serie A players
Liga ACB players
Pallacanestro Reggiana players
People from Battipaglia
Point guards
Saski Baskonia players
Sportspeople from the Province of Salerno
Teramo Basket players
Vanoli Cremona players
Veroli Basket players
Virtus Bologna players